Eudorylas auctus is a species of fly in the family Pipunculidae.

Distribution
Wales.

References

Pipunculidae
Insects described in 2005
Diptera of Europe